The 1996 A-League Grand Final was the first grand final to be held under the A-League name after the short-lived rebranding of the National Soccer League (NSL) began before the 1995–96 season. Melbourne Knights defeated Marconi-Fairfield 2–1 to win their second consecutive grand final.

Route to the final

Melbourne Knights
Melbourne Knights were the first team into the grand final defeating Marconi-Fairfield 3–2 over two legs in the major semi-final.

Marconi-Fairfield
After losing the major semi-final to the Knights, Marconi-Fairfield followed up with a 4–1 win over Adelaide City in the preliminary final to book their place in the grand final.

Pre-match

Venue selection
With Melbourne Knights the first into the final, there was speculation that the Knights would host the match at Somers Street, however Soccer Australia announced on 12 May that the match would be played at Olympic Park.

Match

Details

References

1996 in Australian soccer
NSL Grand Finals
Soccer in Melbourne
Marconi Stallions FC matches
Melbourne Knights FC